Javier E. Arenas (born October 28, 1987) is a former American football cornerback. Arenas played college football for the University of Alabama, earned consensus All-American honors, and was a member of a BCS National Championship team. He was drafted by the Kansas City Chiefs in the second round of the 2010 NFL Draft. He has also played for the Arizona Cardinals, New York Jets, Atlanta Falcons, and Buffalo Bills of the National Football League (NFL). Arenas also had a brief stint with the Ottawa Redblacks of the Canadian Football League (CFL).

Early years
Arenas was born in Tampa, Florida. He attended Robinson High School in Tampa, where he was a first-team All-Suncoast selection in football and a track star. In high school football, he was a highly regarded punt returner and defensive back. He was named USA Navy Player of the Week and Bright House Player of the Week in 2005. He set the record for most punt and kick returns for touchdowns at Robinson as a senior, with four punt-return touchdowns and three kickoff returns for scores, scoring 16 touchdowns overall.

In track & field, Arenas was an standout sprinter, competing in the 200-meter dash, with a personal-best time of 22.9 seconds, and in the 400-meter dash, with a personal-best time of 51.48 seconds. He was also a member of the Knights relay teams, running PR of 42.9 seconds in the 4 × 100m, 1:32.31 minutes in the 4 × 200m and 3:30.08 minutes in the 4 × 400m.

Regarded as a three-star recruit by Rivals, Arenas chose Alabama over Florida Atlantic.

College career

Arenas attended the University of Alabama, where he played for coaches Mike Shula,  Joe Kines, and Nick Saban from 2006 to 2009. In the 2006 season, he managed two punt return touchdowns, one against Florida International and one against Oklahoma State in the Independence Bowl. In the 2007 season, he added a 61-yard punt return touchdown against LSU. In the 2008 season, he recorded one pick-six, which came against Arkansas, and three punt return touchdowns, which came against Tulane, Mississippi State, and Utah in the Sugar Bowl. On November 21, 2009, Arenas broke Derek Abney's Southeastern Conference (SEC) record for career punt return touchdowns by returning his seventh punt return for a touchdown against the Chattanooga Mocs in Bryant–Denny Stadium. Following his senior season, he was a first-team All-SEC selection and was recognized as a consensus first-team All-American. The 2009 Crimson Tide completed an undefeated 14–0 season, beat the Florida Gators 32–13 to win the 2009 SEC Championship Game, and then defeated the Texas Longhorns 37–21 to win the 2010 BCS National Championship.

Arenas left Alabama with 1,752 punt return yards and 2,166 kickoff return yards, both school records, along with his career average of 14 yards per punt return.

Professional career

Kansas City Chiefs
Arenas was selected by the Kansas City Chiefs in the second round, 50th overall of the 2010 NFL Draft. The Chiefs previously traded tight end Tony Gonzalez to the Atlanta Falcons to acquire the pick used to select Arenas. On July 28, 2010, Arenas signed a 4-year, $3.798 million contract with the Chiefs. In the 2010 season, he had 39 punt returns for 322 net yards and 24 kick returns for 509 net yards.

Arenas scored his first career touchdown on October 23, 2011, against the Oakland Raiders. Arenas finished the 2011 season with 2 interceptions, 33 tackles, and 1 sack. He also recovered a fumble in the game against the Pittsburgh Steelers.

For the 2012 season, Arenas tallied 53 solo tackles and 1 forced fumble in 16 games played. He also logged 204 yards in kickoff returns and 297 yards in punt returns on special teams.

Arizona Cardinals
On May 1, 2013, Arenas was traded to the Arizona Cardinals in exchange for Anthony Sherman.

Atlanta Falcons
On March 18, 2014, Arenas signed a one-year contract with the Atlanta Falcons.

New York Jets
Arenas was signed by the New York Jets on August 11, 2015. He was waived on August 30.

Buffalo Bills 
On February 3, 2016, Arenas signed a futures contract with the Buffalo Bills. On August 7, 2016, Arenas was released by the Bills.

Ottawa Redblacks 
On March 2, 2017, Arenas signed with the Ottawa Redblacks of the Canadian Football League (CFL). He was released by the Redblacks on June 18, 2017.

NFL statistics

Personal life
Javier grew up on the east side of Tampa, in the College Hill area, the same place MLB standout Dwight Gooden grew up. At the age of 13, he was diagnosed with a double aorta arch which required doctors to go in and remove. He is the cousin of former NBA point guard Gilbert Arenas. Like Gilbert, his paternal grandfather is of Cuban descent. His brother, Armando Murillo, was a Golden Helmet winner at Robinson High School in Tampa, and started at defensive back for the University of Nebraska in 2007 and 2008.

On May 21, 2011, Arenas graced the cover of Sports Illustrated after an EF4 tornado tore through Tuscaloosa during the April 2011 Super Outbreak. 64 people were killed in Tuscaloosa alone and some 324 lives lost altogether in the SE U.S. region.

Arenas is currently assisting the defensive backs and punt returners at his Alma Mater, The University of Alabama. 2017 was his first year back at the university in a coaching capacity, and won a CFP national title while helping his Tide defeat the University of Georgia Bulldogs, led by his former UA defensive coordinator, Kirby Smart.

References

External links
Atlanta Falcons bio 
Alabama Crimson Tide bio

1987 births
Living people
Alabama Crimson Tide football players
Alabama Crimson Tide football coaches
All-American college football players
American football cornerbacks
American football return specialists
American sportspeople of Cuban descent
Canadian football defensive backs
American players of Canadian football
Atlanta Falcons players
Arizona Cardinals players
Kansas City Chiefs players
New York Jets players
Buffalo Bills players
Ottawa Redblacks players
Players of American football from Tampa, Florida
Players of Canadian football from Tampa, Florida